Stormont Loch Halt railway station served the area of Stormont, Perth and Kinross, Scotland from 1920 to 1955 on the Scottish Midland Junction Railway.

History 
The station opened in 1920 by the Scottish Midland Junction Railway. It was used earlier in June and July 1919 for school parties. It closed in 1955.

References

External links 

Disused railway stations in Perth and Kinross
Railway stations in Great Britain opened in 1920
Railway stations in Great Britain closed in 1955
1920 establishments in Scotland
1955 disestablishments in Scotland